Astrid Basson (born 21 December 1999), professionally known as Dakota Schiffer, is an English drag performer who competed on the fourth series of RuPaul's Drag Race UK.

Early life and education
Dakota Schiffer lives in West Sussex, England. She was bullied at school for "being too feminine". Dakota Schiffer is a trans woman and queer; she came out as queer at the age of 15, along with her non-binary identical twin.

Dakota Schiffer enjoyed fashion and make-up and discovered drag as a teenager. She attended University College London, where she studied geography.

Career
Dakota Schiffer competed on the fourth series of RuPaul's Drag Race UK. She is the first trans contestant to appear on the UK series. She placed in the bottom two on the first episode, but won the lip sync battle against fellow contestant Just May. Her runway look for the second episode, where she won the challenge, was inspired by Pokémon. Dakota Schiffer went on to win another challenge in episode three and was eliminated in week 7 following a lip sync against Pixie Polite.

Filmography

Television
 RuPaul's Drag Race UK (series 4)

Discography

References

External links
 

1999 births
Living people
20th-century LGBT people
21st-century LGBT people
Alumni of University College London
English drag queens
English twins
People from Horsham
Queer women
RuPaul's Drag Race UK contestants
Transgender drag performers
Transgender women